Odbojkaški klub Crvena zvezda is a professional volleyball club based in Belgrade, Serbia. Its name Crvena zvezda means Red Star and it is part of the SD Crvena Zvezda sports society. It has a men's and a women's section. It is the most successful team in Serbian volleyball in women's category.
OK Crvena zvezda is ranked 27th (as of October 2016) in the Men's European clubs ranking.

Team roster 2022–23

Men
Coach: Igor Žakić

Women
Coach: Ratko Pavličević

Achievements and titles

Men
National Championship – 12
 Yugoslav Volleyball Championship:
 Winners (5): 1951, 1954, 1956, 1957, 1973–74
 Runners-up (2): 1952, 1975–76
 Third place (9): 1948, 1949, 1955, 1959, 1962, 1968–69, 1969–70, 1972–73, 1974–75

 Volleyball League of Serbia and Montenegro:
 Winners (1): 2002–03
 Runners-up (5): 1991–92, 1993–94, 1994–95, 1996–97, 1998–99
 Third place (2): 2004–05, 2005–06

 Volleyball League of Serbia:
 Winners (6): 2007–08, 2011–12, 2012–13, 2013–14, 2014–15, 2015–16
 Runners-up (3): 2009–10, 2016–17, 2018–19
 Third place (3): 2008–09, 2010–11, 2017–18

National Cup – 14
 Yugoslav Cup:
 Winners (5): 1959–60, 1972, 1973, 1975, 1991
 Runners-up (1): 1989

 Serbia and Montenegro Cup:
 Winners (3): 1993, 1997, 1999
 Runners-up (3): 1992, 1998, 2003

 Serbian Cup:
 Winners (6): 2008–09, 2010–11, 2012–13, 2013–14, 2015–16, 2018–19
 Runners-up (1): 2017–18

National Super Cup – 5
 Serbian Super Cup:
 Winners (5): 2011, 2012, 2013, 2014, 2016
 Runners-up (2): 2015, 2019

International
 CEV Challenge Cup:
 Quarter-finalists (3): 1997–98, 2013–14, 2014–15

Women
National Championship – 28
 Yugoslav Volleyball Championship:
 Winners (18): 1959, 1962, 1963, 1964, 1965, 1966, 1967, 1968–69, 1969–70, 1970–71, 1971–72, 1974–75, 1975–76, 1976–77, 1977–78, 1978–79, 1981–82, 1982–83
 Runners-up (10): 1956, 1958, 1960, 1961, 1967–68, 1972–73, 1973–74, 1979–80, 1980–81, 1990–91

 Volleyball League of Serbia and Montenegro:
 Winners (5): 1991–92, 1992–93, 2001–02, 2002–03, 2003–04
 Third place (1): 2005–06

 Volleyball League of Serbia:
 Winners (5): 2009–10, 2010–11, 2011–12, 2012–13, 2021–22
 Runners-up (4): 2007–08, 2008–09, 2013–14, 2017–18
 Third place (2): 2006–07, 2014–15

National Cup – 18
 Yugoslav Cup:
 Winners (10): 1960, 1961, 1962, 1972, 1974, 1976–77, 1979, 1982, 1983, 1991
 Runners-up (2): 1980, 1986

 Serbia and Montenegro Cup:
 Winners (2): 1992, 2002
 Runners-up (4): 1993, 1997, 1999, 2004

 Serbian Cup:
 Winners (6): 2009–10, 2010–11, 2011–12, 2012–13, 2013–14, 2021–22
 Runners-up (4): 2006–07, 2008–09, 2017–18, 2018–19

National Super Cup – 1
 Serbian Super Cup:
 Winners (1): 2022
 Runners-up (3): 2013, 2014, 2019

International
 CEV Women's Champions League:
 Fourth place (1): 1975–76
 Quarter-finalists (2): 1962–63, 1963–64

 Women's CEV Cup:
 Runners-up (1): 2009–10
 Third place (1): 2007–08
 Semi-finalists (1): 2010–11
 Quarter-finalists (1): 2008–09

 CEV Women's Challenge Cup:
 Third place (1): 1985–86

Notable players
Men

 Aleksandar Boričić
 Nikola Matijašević
 Slobodan Lozančić
 Vladimir Bošnjak
 Živojin Vračarić
 Miodrag Mitić
 Dejan Brđović
 Vladimir Batez
 Ratko Pavličević
 Edin Škorić
 Rajko Jokanović
 Željko Tanasković
 Bojan Janić
 Milan Vasić
 Dejan Bojović
 Marko Samardžić
 Vlado Petković
 Nikola Kovačević
 Dragan Stanković
 Milan Rašić
 Tomislav Dokić
 Miloš Terzić
 Mihajlo Mitić
 Nemanja Jakovljević
 Dušan Petković
 Filip Vujić
 Filip Stoilović
 Lazar Koprivica
 Maksim Buculjević
 Aleksandar Okolić
 Aleksandar Blagojević
 Vuk Milutinović
 Nemanja Mašulović
 Nikola Meljanac

Women

 Olga Shkurnova
 Branka Sekulić
 Neli Marinova
 Maja Simanić
 Anja Spasojević
 Ivana Đerisilo
 Slađana Erić
 Dragana Ilić
 Maja Ognjenović
 Ivana Isailović
 Liana Mesa
 Stefana Veljković
 Ivana Nešović
 Nina Rosić
 Bojana Drča
 Nađa Ninković
 Jelena Blagojević
 Sanja Malagurski
 Tamara Rakić
 Ana Bjelica
 Jovana Stevanović
 Júlia Milovits
 Mina Popović
 Ljubica Kecman
 Teodora Pušić
 Vesna Čitaković
 Bojana Milenković
 Tijana Malešević
 Dajana Bošković
 Ana Živojinović

References

External links
Official Site

Tref Sport - Official Sponsor

Serbian volleyball clubs
Sport in Belgrade
Volleyball clubs established in 1945
Crvena zvezda
1945 establishments in Serbia

pl:OK Crvena zvezda Belgrad
sr:ОК Црвена звезда